Frank Wennmann (born 1959) is a retired German swimmer who won four medals at the European and world championships in 1977–1981, three of them in the  freestyle relay. Between 1978 and 1980 he also won three national titles in the 200 m and 400 m freestyle events.

References

1959 births
Living people
German male swimmers
German male freestyle swimmers
World Aquatics Championships medalists in swimming
European Aquatics Championships medalists in swimming
21st-century German people
20th-century German people